Wańkowicz (Vankovich, Lacinka: Vańkovič) is a Polish and Belarusian surname. Notable people with the surname include:

 Melchior Wańkowicz (1892–1974), Belarus-born Polish writer, journalist, and publisher
 Walenty Wańkowicz (1799–1842), Belarus-born Polish painter

Polish-language surnames
Belarusian-language surnames